The Utah Starzz were a Women's National Basketball Association (WNBA) team based in Salt Lake City. They began play in the 1997 WNBA season as one of the league's eight original teams.

History
One of the eight original WNBA teams, the Starzz, which was partially named after the old ABA team. Utah Jazz ownership was not interested in keeping the Starzz, and without new owners the team would have folded. No local ownership was found, so in 2002, the Starzz announced their intentions to move out of Salt Lake City. On December 5, 2002, the Utah Starzz was bought by Spurs Sports & Entertainment, and it was announced that the Starzz would move immediately to San Antonio and change their nickname to the Silver Stars.

The Starzz were the sister team to the NBA's Utah Jazz.

The Starzz relocated, in 2003, to San Antonio where the team became the San Antonio Silver Stars.

Uniforms
1997–2002: For home games, white with blue on the sides and shoulders and white Starzz logo text on the chest. For away games, blue with purple on the sides and white Starzz logo text on the chest. The Starzz logo is on the shorts.

Season-by-season records

Players

Final roster
{| class="toccolours" style="font-size: 95%; width: 100%;"
|-
! colspan="2" style="text-align:center; background-color:#006666; color:#FFFFFF;"|Utah Starzz roster
|- style="text-align:center; background-color:#330099; color:#FFFFFF;"
! Players !! Coaches
|- 
| valign="top" |
{| class="sortable" style="background:transparent; margin:0px; width:100%;"
! Pos. !! # !! Nat. !! Name !! Ht. !! Wt. !! From
|-

Notable players
Margo Dydek
Marie Ferdinand-Harris
Kristen Rasmussen
Olympia Scott
Natalie Williams
Fran Harris
Erin Alexander
Adrienne Goodson

FIBA Hall of Fame

Coaches

Head coaches
Denise Taylor (1997–1998)
Frank Layden (1998–1999)
Fred Williams (1999–2001)
Candi Harvey (2001–2002)

General managers
Tim Howells (1997–1999)

All-time notes

Draft picks
1997 Elite Draft: Dena Head (1), Wendy Palmer (9)
1997 WNBA Draft: Tammi Reiss (5), Jessie Hicks (12), Raegan Scott (21), Kim Williams (28)
1998 WNBA Draft: Margo Dydek (1), Olympia Scott (11), LaTonya Johnson (21), Tricia Bader (31)
1999 WNBA Draft: Natalie Williams (3), Debbie Black (15), Adrienne Goodson (27), Dalma Ivanyi (39)
2000 WNBA Draft: Naomi Mulitauaopele (12), Stacy Frese (35), Kristen Rasmussen (51)
2001 WNBA Draft: Marie Ferdinand (8), Michaela Pavlickova (24), Shea Ralph (40), Cara Consuegra (56)
2002 WNBA Draft: Danielle Crockrom (11), Andrea Gardner (27), Edmarie Lumbsley (43), Jaclyn Winfield (59)

All-stars
1999: Natalie Williams
2000: Natalie Williams
2001: Natalie Williams
2002: Marie Ferdinand, Adrienne Goodson

References

External links
 Official Site (October 2002) (Archived)

 
Basketball teams established in 1997
Basketball teams disestablished in 2002
Relocated Women's National Basketball Association teams
Sports in Salt Lake City
Basketball teams in Utah
1997 establishments in Utah
2002 disestablishments in Utah